Depressigyra is a genus of sea snails, marine gastropod mollusks in the family Peltospiridae.

Species
Species within the genus Depressigyra include:
 Depressigyra globulus Warén & Bouchet, 1989
Species brought into synonymy
 Depressigyra planispira Warén & Bouchet, 1989: synonym of Planorbidella planispira (Warén & Bouchet, 1989)

References

External links

Peltospiridae
Monotypic gastropod genera